Balshagray Victoria Park Church is a Parish church of the Church of Scotland located in the Broomhill area of Glasgow, Scotland.

History
The church building was designed by Stewart and Paterson in the Neo-Gothic style, and was built between 1908 and 1909, with the foundation stone being laid on 30 May 1908. It was built in a cruciform, using Snecked red sandstone ashlar.

Stained glass
The church includes a number of memorial stained glass windows, including one to the Fallen of WWI in the chancel, and another to the Scottish Industries by Sadie McLellan dating from 1950, among others.

Congregation
In 1991, the congregation of Victoria Park parish Church united with that of Balshagray Parish Church, forming the Balshagray Victoria Park congregation, whilst retaining use of the Balshagray Church building. The 'New' Victoria Park Church building was demolished in 1993, the old church having been demolished in the 1960s to make way for the Clyde Tunnel.

References

Churches completed in 1912
Church of Scotland churches in Glasgow
Listed churches in Glasgow
Category B listed buildings in Glasgow
1908 establishments in Scotland